Ziegelsee is a lake in Nordwestmecklenburg, Mecklenburg-Vorpommern, Germany.

External links 

 

Lakes of Mecklenburg-Western Pomerania
Federal waterways in Germany